Carlos Egan Asay (June 12, 1926 – April 10, 1999) was a general authority of the Church of Jesus Christ of Latter-day Saints (LDS Church) from 1976 until his death.

Early life
Asay was born in Sutherland, Utah, and raised in Monroe, Utah. In 1947, just prior to leaving on his mission, Asay married Colleen Webb.

From 1947 to 1950, he served as an LDS Church missionary in Palestine, Syria and Lebanon. When he first arrived in the mission, Asay had a hard time finding his mission president, Badwagan Piranian, who was also arriving from Switzerland. Asay and his mission companion eventually managed to locate Piranian and his wife in Beirut, Lebanon. Asay gained publicity for the church by joining the Lebanese national basketball team.

Asay had a bachelor's degree from the University of Utah, a master's degree from California State University, Long Beach and a doctorate from the University of Utah. Asay was a member of the University of Utah basketball team that won the NIT championship in 1947.

LDS Church service
Asay served in a variety of callings in the LDS Church, including bishop, regional representative, and member of the general board of the Sunday School. He was president of the church's Texas North Mission from 1970 to 1973 and later was the president of the church's International Mission.

In 1976, Asay became a general authority and a member of the First Quorum of the Seventy; his first assignment was to head the church's missionary department. Allegations of sexual abuse by a Missionary Training Center president during his tenure have been raised; however, there is no evidence that Asay was aware of these allegations.

He was a member of the seven-man Presidency of the Seventy twice, from 1980 to 1986 and from 1989 to 1996; in 1985–86 and 1995–96, he was the senior member of the presidency. In 1986, Asay served as the executive director of the church's curriculum department. In October 1996, Asay was designated as an emeritus general authority and appointed president of the Salt Lake Temple. He died of a heart attack while serving in that calling. His funeral was held in the Salt Lake Assembly Hall on Temple Square in Salt Lake City, Utah.

See also
Gerry Avant, "Elder Asay eulogized for lifetime of service", Church News, 1999-04-17
"Elder Carlos E. Asay of the First Quorum of the Seventy," Ensign, May 1976, p. 134

References

External links
General Authorities and General Officers: Elder Carlos E. Asay

1926 births
1999 deaths
American Mormon missionaries in the United States
California State University, Long Beach alumni
Members of the First Quorum of the Seventy (LDS Church)
Mission presidents (LDS Church)
American Mormon missionaries in Palestine (region)
American Mormon missionaries in Syria
People from Monroe, Utah
Presidents of the Seventy (LDS Church)
Regional representatives of the Twelve
Temple presidents and matrons (LDS Church)
University of Utah alumni
20th-century Mormon missionaries
Sunday School (LDS Church) people
Mormon missionaries in Lebanon
American general authorities (LDS Church)
Utah Utes men's basketball players
People from Millard County, Utah
American men's basketball players